Ai Ishigaki (also known as 'ISHIG∀KI' born 25 December 1970) was the guitarist for The Mad Capsule Markets from 1990 to 1996. He got the job as support guitarist after being a roadie for MCM in the Berrie days. Ishigaki debuted on their Thrash-Punk album P.O.P and later became the more well known guitarist because he could bring a softer, more experimental acoustic element to their later releases. Ishigaki left the band in 1996, it was stated that the harder direction on 4 Plugs may have been why. After leaving, Ishigaki worked on solo material, formed Blade with actor Shinji Takeda, and contributed guitar to other bands, including Tomoyasu Hotei who was an ex-member of Japanese rock group Boøwy.

References

External links
http://www.redblood.com/ Fansite, not updated since 2001
http://www.ends.co.jp/ Ends website

Living people
1970 births
Japanese rock guitarists
Punk rock guitarists
Japanese punk rock musicians
The Mad Capsule Markets members
20th-century Japanese guitarists
21st-century Japanese guitarists